Louis Guirola Jr. (born 1951) is a senior United States district judge of the United States District Court for the Southern District of Mississippi and a Judge on the United States Foreign Intelligence Surveillance Court and the United States Alien Terrorist Removal Court.

Education and career 

Born in Baltimore, Maryland, Guirola received a Bachelor of Arts degree from William Carey College in 1973 and a Juris Doctor from the University of Mississippi Law School in 1979. He was in private practice in Mississippi from 1979 to 1980 and again from 1986 to 1990. He was an assistant district attorney of 19th Judicial District, Mississippi from 1980 to 1984, and a county board attorney of Jackson County, Mississippi from 1984 to 1986. He was an Assistant United States Attorney of the Eastern District of Texas from 1990 to 1993.

Federal judicial service 

Guirola was a United States magistrate judge of the United States District Court for the Western District of Texas from 1993 to 1996, and of United States District Court for the Southern District of Mississippi from 1996 to 2004. On September 23, 2003, Guirola was nominated by President George W. Bush to a seat on the Southern District of Mississippi vacated by Walter J. Gex III. Guirola was confirmed by the United States Senate on March 12, 2004, and received his commission on March 22, 2004. He served as Chief Judge from 2010 to 2017. He assumed senior status on March 23, 2018.

Foreign Intelligence Surveillance Court

On May 15, 2019, Chief Justice John Roberts appointed Guirola to the Foreign Intelligence Surveillance Court for a term beginning July 2, 2019.

Alien Terrorist Removal Court

In 2021, he was appointed to a 5-year term on the United States Alien Terrorist Removal Court.

References

External links 

1951 births
Living people
Assistant United States Attorneys
Hispanic and Latino American judges
Judges of the United States District Court for the Southern District of Mississippi
Judges of the United States Foreign Intelligence Surveillance Court
People from Baltimore
United States district court judges appointed by George W. Bush
United States magistrate judges
University of Mississippi School of Law alumni
William Carey University alumni
21st-century American judges